What It Feels Like may refer to:

"What It Feels Like" (song), by  Nipsey Hussle and Jay-Z from Judas and the Black Messiah soundtrack
"What it Feels Like", a column in Esquire magazine
"What It Feels Like", song by Prince from Art Official Age
"What It Feels Like", song by Sandro Cavazza  
"What It Feels Like", song by  We Are the Ocean 
"What It Feels Like", song by  FFH

See also
 "This Is What It Feels Like", a 2013 song by Dutch DJ Armin van Buuren
 "This Is What It Feels Like", a song by American singer-songwriter Banks
 "What It Feels Like for a Girl", a 2000 song by American singer-songwriter Madonna